The Battle of Milliken's Bend was fought on June 7, 1863, as part of the Vicksburg Campaign during the American Civil War.  Major General Ulysses S. Grant of the Union Army had placed the strategic Mississippi River city of Vicksburg, Mississippi, under siege in mid-1863.  Confederate leadership erroneously believed that Grant's supply line still ran through Milliken's Bend in Louisiana, and Major General Richard Taylor was tasked with disrupting it to aid the defense of Vicksburg.  Taylor sent Brigadier General Henry E. McCulloch with a brigade of Texans to attack Milliken's Bend, which was held by a brigade of newly-recruited African American soldiers.  McCulloch's attack struck early on the morning of June 7, and was initially successful in close-quarters fighting.  Fire from the Union gunboat USS Choctaw halted the Confederate attack, and McCulloch later withdrew after the arrival of a second gunboat.  The attempt to relieve Vicksburg was unsuccessful.  One of the first actions in which African American soldiers fought, Milliken's Bend demonstrated the value of African American soldiers as part of the Union Army.

Background
In the spring of 1863, Major General Ulysses S. Grant of the Union Army began a campaign against the strategic Confederate-held city of Vicksburg, Mississippi.  Grant's troops crossed the Mississippi River from the Louisiana side into Mississippi at a point south of Vicksburg in late April.  By May 18, the Union army had fought its way to Vicksburg, surrounded it, and initiated the Siege of Vicksburg.  During the campaign, Grant had kept a supply base at Milliken's Bend in Louisiana as part of his supply line.  Soldiers had been housed at the site before being deployed in the campaign, and a number of hospitals had been established there.  During the siege, however, Grant had a different supply line opened: the Union Navy took control of part of the Yazoo River in the Chickasaw Bayou vicinity and established a point from which supplies could be sent overland behind the Union lines.  While a position at Milliken's Bend was still held, its importance was greatly reduced, since the Yazoo River position had become Grant's primary supply depot.

Meanwhile, Confederate President Jefferson Davis was pressuring General E. K. Smith, commander of the Trans-Mississippi Department, to attempt to relieve Vicksburg's garrison.  Smith was unaware that Grant had moved his supply line to the Yazoo River, and still believed that Milliken's Bend was a primary Union supply depot.  Immediate command of the offensive fell to Major General Richard Taylor, who was given a division of Texans known as Walker's Greyhounds.  Taylor moved the 5,000-man force to Richmond, Louisiana, but did not believe that the coming expedition had any real chance of disrupting Grant's siege of Vicksburg.  On June 5, Taylor learned that Milliken's Bend was no longer a significant supply point, but the planned offensive continued, with hopes of retaking control of the west bank of the Mississippi River and gaining the ability to send food across the river into Vicksburg.  At Richmond, on June 6, Taylor detached the 13th Louisiana Cavalry Battalion on a raid against Lake Providence, Louisiana, while Walker's Greyhounds continued to the site of Oak Grove Plantation, where there was a road junction.  One Confederate brigade split off to move against a Union position at Young's Point, while Brigadier General Henry E. McCulloch's brigade advanced against Milliken's Bend.  A third brigade was held in reserve at Oak Grove.

The Union posts at Milliken's Bend, Young's Point, and Lake Providence had become training grounds for African American soldiers.  These soldiers were primarily newly-recruited freed slaves.  Union leadership's plan had been to use these soldiers as laborers and camp guards rather than front-line soldiers, so they had only received basic military training.  At this time, the Colored Troop units were commanded by white officers.  Mustering these soldiers into the Union Army faced some opposition, with some believing that they would not fight.  The support of several officers, including Major General John A. Logan, however, helped to reduce some of the resistance.  The soldiers at Milliken's Bend had no prior experience with firearms before joining the Union Army, and demonstrated very poor marksmanship during training.  Colonel Hermann Lieb commanded the camp, which was manned by an infantry brigade of African American soldiers and some cavalry from Illinois.

Both Lieb and Brigadier General Elias Dennis, who commanded the Union troops in the area, suspected that the Confederates were preparing to attack Milliken's Bend.  Lieb's 9th Louisiana Infantry Regiment and 10th Illinois Cavalry Regiment had encountered Confederates near Tallulah on June 6 during an expedition towards Richmond.  Lieb requested reinforcements, and the 23rd Iowa Infantry Regiment and the ironclad USS Choctaw were sent to Milliken's Bend.

Battle

On June 7, McCulloch's 1,500 Confederates marched to Milliken's Bend in the cooler nighttime, and by 02:30 arrived within 1.5 miles of Milliken's Bend. By 03:00, they were within  of the Union position.  Lieb's 1,100 Union soldiers had constructed a defensive position by forming a breastwork out of cotton bales on top of a levee.  The Union pickets were quickly driven back by the Confederates.  McCulloch aligned his regiments with the 19th Texas Infantry Regiment, 17th Texas Infantry Regiment, and the 16th Texas Cavalry Regiment, from right to left; the 16th Texas Infantry Regiment was held as a reserve.  Lieb's defensive line was held by the 23rd Iowa Infantry Regiment and the U.S. Colored Troops of the 8th Louisiana Infantry Regiment, the 9th Louisiana Infantry Regiment, the 10th Louisiana Infantry Regiment, the 11th Louisiana Infantry Regiment, the 13th Louisiana Infantry Regiment, and the 1st Mississippi Infantry Regiment.  The main Union line fired a volley that temporarily slowed the Confederate attack, but the poorly trained African American soldiers were largely unable to reload their weapons before the Confederate charge continued and became close-quarters fighting.  Bayonets were used in the fighting, and the Union defenders were driven back.  Lieb's men fell back to a second levee, and the Confederates charged, yelling that no mercy would be given.

During this stage of the fighting, few shots were fired, as the use of rifles as blunt weapons and bayonets was more common.  By 04:00, the Confederates seemed to have victory, but they then made the mistake of exposing themselves on the top of the levee.  Heavy fire from the large guns of USS Choctaw drove McCulloch's men back off the levee.  Confederate leadership was unable to get the Texans to attack the levee again.  McCulloch requested reinforcements to continue the fighting, but another Union vessel, the timberclad USS Lexington, arrived around 09:00.  McCulloch withdrew his men off the field back to Oak Grove Plantation in the face of the gunboats.

Aftermath and preservation

The fight at Milliken's Bend cost the Union 652 men: 101 killed, 285 wounded, and 266 missing.  Many of the missing men were African American soldiers who had been captured and returned to slavery.  All but 65 of the Union casualties were incurred by the Colored Troops, with the 9th Louisiana Infantry suffering the worst with 68 percent of its strength becoming casualties.  The Confederates lost 185 men.  Rumors of the execution of captured Union soldiers reached Grant, who asked Taylor about the reports.  Taylor denied that any executions occurred.

The other two prongs of the coordinated Confederate attacks accomplished little at the Battle of Young's Point and the Battle of Lake Providence.  The column sent to Young's Point was delayed by bad guides and a washed-out bridge, and did not reach the Union camp until 10:30.  After watching additional Union troops arrive at the camp, along with the gunboats, the Confederates withdrew without a fight.  After Milliken's Bend, the Confederates fell back to Monroe, Louisiana, and Taylor travelled to Alexandria, Louisiana, where he focused more attention on the Union forces at New Orleans, Louisiana, than Vicksburg.  Smith and the Trans-Mississippi Confederates no longer were able to influence the outcome of the Siege of Vicksburg.  The city surrendered on July 4.  The position at Milliken's Bend had fallen out of relevance not long after the battle when the men and supplies stored there were transferred to Young's Point.

Parts of the site of the battle have been destroyed by changes in the course of the Mississippi River. At the time of the study, there was no public interpretation of the battle at the site. , a commemorative plaque for Milliken's Bend exists on a roadside near Richmond, and exhibits discussing the battle are present at Vicksburg National Military Park. Additionally, an interpretive exhibit exists at Grant's Canal in Louisiana.

Significance and legacy
Leaders on both sides noted the performance of the African American troops at Milliken's Bend. Unionist Charles Dana reported that the action convinced many in the Union Army to support the enlistment of African American soldiers.  Dennis stated "it is impossible for men to show greater gallantry than the Negro troops in this fight."  Grant described the battle as the first significant engagement in which the Colored Troops had seen combat, described their conduct as "most gallant" and said that "with good officers they will make good troops."  Confederate leader McCulloch later reported that while the white Union troops had been routed, the Colored Troop had fought with "considerable obstinacy."  One modern historian wrote in 1960 that the fighting at Milliken's Bend brought "the acceptance of the Negro as a soldier", which was important to "his acceptance as a man."

U.S. Secretary of War Edwin M. Stanton also praised the performance of black U.S. soldiers in the battle. He stated that their competent performance in the battle proved wrong those who had opposed their service:

Notes

References

Sources

Further reading
 
 
 Lowe, Richard G. "Battle on the Levee: The Fight at Milliken's Bend." In Black Soldiers in Blue: African American Troops in the Civil War Era, edited by John David Smith, 107–135. University of North Carolina Press, 2002.
 Sears, Cyrus. Paper of Cyrus Sears (The Battle of Milliken's Bend), Columbus, OH: F.J. Heer Printing, 1909.
 Winschel, Terrence J. "To Rescue Gibraltar: John Walker's Texas Division and Its Expedition to Relieve Fortress Vicksburg." Civil War Regiments 3, no. 3 (1993): 33–58.

External links

 Milliken's Bend: A Civil War Battle in History and Memory
 PBS' Timeline: African Americans in the Civil War; see June 7, 1863: Milliken's Bend-Louisiana
 Battle of Milliken's Bend – Pantagraph (Bloomington, IL newspaper)

Milliken's Bend
Milliken's Bend
Milliken's Bend
Millikin's Bend
Madison Parish, Louisiana
June 1863 events
1863 in Louisiana